Silver Mountain is a 13,470-foot-elevation (4,106 meter) mountain summit located in San Miguel County of southwest Colorado, United States. It is situated 4.5 miles south of the town of Telluride, on land managed by Uncompahgre National Forest. It is part of the San Juan Mountains which are a subset of the Rocky Mountains, and is west of the Continental Divide. Silver Mountain ranks as the 274th-highest peak in Colorado, and topographic relief is significant as the south aspect rises 3,770 feet above Ophir in 1.5 mile. The mountain's name has been officially adopted by the United States Board on Geographic Names in association with silver mines on the peak's flanks.

Climate 
According to the Köppen climate classification system, Silver Mountain is located in an alpine subarctic climate zone with cold, snowy winters, and cool to warm summers. Due to its altitude, it receives precipitation all year, as snow in winter, and as thunderstorms in summer, with a dry period in late spring. Precipitation runoff from the mountain drains into tributaries of the San Miguel River.

See also 

 Palmyra Peak

References

External links 
 Weather forecast: Silver Mountain
 Palmyra Peak (left) and Silver Mountain (right) photo: Flickr

Mountains of San Miguel County, Colorado
San Juan Mountains (Colorado)
Mountains of Colorado
North American 4000 m summits
Uncompahgre National Forest